Alfred Henry Abell (May 7, 1824May 24, 1882) was a member of the Wisconsin State Assembly.

Biography
Abell was born on May 7, 1824 in Duanesburg, New York. Later, he owned farms in Bloomfield, Walworth County, Wisconsin, and Geneva, Wisconsin. He died on May 24, 1882.

Political career
Abell was a member of the Assembly during the 1877 session. He had already served as Chairman (similar to Mayor) and Supervisor of Bloomfield. Abell was a Republican.

References

People from Duanesburg, New York
People from Walworth County, Wisconsin
Republican Party members of the Wisconsin State Assembly
Mayors of places in Wisconsin
Farmers from Wisconsin
1824 births
19th-century American politicians
People from Geneva, Wisconsin
1882 deaths